Wez may refer to:

 Wez-Velvain, a village in the province of Hainaut, Belgium
 Wez, a former French commune, now part of Val-de-Vesle, Marne département
 Wez, a character in the film Mad Max 2

See also